Mohammad Bidarian (born September 9, 1988 in Tehran) is an Iranian Swimmer. He holds Iran's 50 meters freestyle with a time of 23.67 seconds. Bidarian competed in 2012 Summer Olympics – Men's 100 metre freestyle and finished 42nd.

References

External links
 Mohammad Bidarian on instagram

Living people
Iranian male swimmers
Olympic swimmers of Iran
Swimmers at the 2012 Summer Olympics
1988 births
Sportspeople from Tehran
Swimmers at the 2006 Asian Games
Swimmers at the 2010 Asian Games
Asian Games competitors for Iran
21st-century Iranian people